Elaine Hatfield (formerly also known as Elaine Walster) is an American social psychologist. She has been credited, alongside Ellen S. Berscheid, as the pioneer of the scientific study of love. She is employed as a professor in the psychology department of the University of Hawaii.

Education
Hatfield received her BA in Psychology and English in 1959 from the University of Michigan and her PhD from Stanford University in 1963.

Career 
Relationship science was Hatfield's first professional research focus, beginning at the foundation of her career in the 1960s with an emphasis on human attraction and the nature of romantic love. In addition to Berscheid, she has conducted this research with a number of colleagues, including Leon Festinger—her dissertation advisor at Stanford University--, Elliot Aronson, William Walster, Russell D. Clark, and Susan Sprecher. The "Passionate Love Scale", developed in 1986 by Hatfield and Sprecher, is one of the most widely used in the field.

Hatfield's research in the area has not been without controversy—in 1975, the $84,000 grant she was awarded by the National Science Foundation became the focus of the first Golden Fleece Award for wasteful government spending by then United States Senator William Proxmire. Due to Proxmire's campaign, the funding was rescinded. Undaunted, Hatfield went on to write or co-write many books and papers based on her research, among them A New Look at Love, which won the American Psychological Foundation's National Media Award, and the often-cited Journal of Psychology and Human Sexuality article "Gender Differences in Receptivity to Sexual Offers" (1989).

In the 1990s, Hatfield and husband, American historian Richard Rapson, began researching emotional contagion: the process by which people's emotions are influenced by the demonstrated emotions of their companions. This resulted in the book, with John Caccioppo, on Emotional Contagion. (Cambridge University Press, 1994). In the 2000s, she presented alongside Katherine Aumer on the psychology of hate.

Hatfield is former chair and professor of psychology at the University of Hawai'i and past-president of the Society for the Scientific Study of Sexuality (SSSS). In 2012, the Association for Psychological Science gave Hatfield the William James award for a Lifetime of Scientific Achievement. In recent years, she has received Distinguished Scientist Awards (for a lifetime of scientific achievement) from the Society of Experimental Social Psychology (SESP), from the SSSS, and from the University of Hawai'i, and she has received the Alfred Kinsey Award from the Western Region of SSSS. Two of her books have won the American Psychological Association's National Media Award.

In 2019, She received three more honors: 1) Methodological Innovator Award from the Society for Personality and Social Psychology; 2) Wall of Fame Award from the Heritage Foundation; and 3) the Lifetime Achievement Award from the International Academy for Intercultural Research.

In 2020, her book on the future of love and sex- What's Next in Love and Sex: Psychological and Cultural Perspectives was published by Oxford University Press.

Personal life 
Outside of their research, in 1963 Hatfield and Berscheid, then professors at the University of Minnesota, challenged and overcame the university's prohibition against women on faculty dining in the university's Faculty Club. She has been married to Richard Rapson since 1982.

Select bibliography
Berscheid, E. & Hatfield, E. (1969).  Interpersonal attraction.  New York:  Addison-Wesley.  .
Hatfield, E., Walster, G. W., & Berscheid, E. (1978). Equity: Theory and research.  Boston:  Allyn and Bacon. .
Hatfield, E.  & Walster, G. W.  (1985).  A new look at love.  Lanham, MD:  University Press of America.  [Winner:  American Psychological Foundation's "National Media Award".] .
Berscheid, E. & Hatfield, E. (1978). Interpersonal attraction, (2nd ed.)  Reading, MS:  Addison-Wesley. 
Griffitt, W., & Hatfield, E. (1984). Human sexual behavior.  Glenview, IL:  Scott, Foresman & Co.  
Hatfield, E., & Sprecher, S. (1986). Mirror, mirror:  The importance of looks in everyday life.  New York:  SUNY Press.  [Winner:  American Psychological Association's "National Media Award", 1986.] 
Carlson, J. G.  & Hatfield, E.  (1992).  Psychology of emotion.  New York:  Harcourt, Brace, Jovanovich. 
Hatfield, E., & Rapson, R. L. (1993). Love, sex, and intimacy:  Their psychology, biology, and history.  New York:  HarperCollins. 
Hatfield, E., Cacioppo, J., & Rapson, R. L. (1994). Emotional contagion.  New York:  Cambridge University Press.  
Hatfield, E., & Rapson, R. (1996/2005).  Love and sex: Cross-cultural perspectives.  Needham Heights, MA: Allyn & Bacon.    Reprint: Lanham, MD: University Press of America. .
Hatfield, E., & Rapson, R., and Jeanette Purvis (2020). What's Next in Love and Sex: Psychological and Cultural Perspectives. New York: Oxford University Press. .

References

University of Michigan College of Literature, Science, and the Arts alumni
American women psychologists
21st-century American psychologists
University of Hawaiʻi faculty
1937 births
Living people
Stanford University alumni
Social psychologists
American women academics
21st-century American women
20th-century American psychologists